{{Motorsport season
| series = Ginetta GT4 Supercup
| year = 2020
| footer = 2020 ToCA Support series:2020 BTCC2020 F4 British Championship2020 Ginetta Junior Championship2020 Porsche Carrera Cup GB2020 Mini Challenge UK}}
The 2020 Millers Oils Ginetta GT4 Supercup''' is a multi-event, one make GT motor racing championship held across England and Scotland. The championship features a mix of professional motor racing teams and privately funded drivers, competing in Ginetta G55s that conform to the technical regulations for the championship. It forms part of the extensive program of support categories built up around the BTCC centrepiece. It is the tenth Ginetta GT4 Supercup, having rebranded from the Ginetta G50 Cup, which ran between 2008 and 2010. The season commenced on 2 August at Donington Park and concludes on 15 November at Brands Hatch, utilising the Indy circuit, after nineteen races held at seven meetings, all in support of the 2020 British Touring Car Championship.

Teams and drivers
On 17 January 2020, it was announced that a new Pro-Am class would be added.

Race Calendar

Championship standings

Notes
A driver's best 18 scores counted towards the championship, with any other points being discarded.

Drivers' championships

* Guest entry - not eligible for points

References

External links
 
 Ginetta GT4 Supercup Series News

Ginetta GT4 Supercup
Ginetta GT4 Supercup seasons